Concierto (in English: Concert Radio) is a Chilean radio station located at 88.5 MHz of the FM dial in Santiago de Chile. Also it transmits for all the country with its network of repeaters and by the channel 659 (with D-Box) of the cable operator VTR, 973 in the cable operators GTD and Telefónica del Sur and via internet in the rest of the country and the world.

Direction
In its first stage it was directed under Julián García-Reyes and Juan Enrique Amenábar. From the arrival of the radio to IARC and until 2005, its director was: Javier Sanfeliú. Since January 2013 to May 2021, its director was: Sergio Cancino. Since June 2021, its director is Juan Cristóbal Vera.

Broadcasters and program leaders
During their four stages, several voices have passed through their microphones. These include:
Corporate speakers and voices
Former
 Julián García-Reyes 
 Eleodoro Achondo
 John Gress
 Gabriel Salas Arévalo
 Lalo Mir
 Luis Muñoz
 Eduardo Riveros Behnke
 Fernando Solís
 Blanca Lewin
 Carolina Urrejola
 José "Pepe" Lavat
 Macarena Fernández
Actuales
 Daniel Maldonado Amaro
 Omar González
 Isidora Cousiño

Program Managers
Former
 Alfredo Lewin
 Sergio Fortuño
 Cristián Warnken
 Boris Orellana
 Patricio Urzúa
 Blanca Lewin
 Katyna Huberman
 Cecilia Amenábar
 Polo Ramírez
 Rafael Cavada
  Claudio Fariña
 Santiago Pavlovic
 Pablo Márquez
 Carolina Pulido
 Verónica Calabi
 María José Prieto
 Mirna Schindler
 Andrea Hoffmann
 Cristina González
 Javiera Contador
 Ignacia Allamand
 Macarena Fernández
 Mariana Derderián
 Patricia Venegas
 Álvaro Paci
 Davor Gjuranovic
 Christian Barreau
 Claudia Álamo
 Sergio Cancino
 Elisa Zulueta
 Paloma Moreno
Current
 Patricio Bauerle
 Lorena Bosch
 Jorge Zabaleta
 Andrés Vial
Constanza Santa María
 Consuelo Solar
 Francisca Jorquera
 Álvaro Castilla
 Trinidad Barros
 Bárbara Alcántara
 Natalia Freire
 Felipe Gerdtzen
 Darío Córdova
 Pamela Le Roy
 Natalia del Campo

Programs
Mañana será otro día (Tomorrow will be another day)
Zoom Concierto (Zoom Concert)
Catálogo Concierto (Catalogue Concert)
Concierto Placer (Concert Pleasure)
La comunidad sin añillo (The community without a ring)
Concierto Sabor (Concert Flavor) (only Tuesday)
Artistas Invitados (Guest artists) (only Wednesday)
Destino Final (Final destination) (only Thursday)
Los Diez Mandamientos (The Ten Commandments)
Green News (only Saturday)

Past programs 
 Super 45
 Autocontrol
 La Maquinita
 Caipirinha
 Sandía
 Café Blank
 Objetos Encontrados
 Concierto Enfoque
 Gran Reserva
 Noches Concierto
 Dingo Domingo
 Club Radical
 Box Set Concierto
 Concierto Discoteque
 Ñam en Concierto
 La Personal
 En Vivo y en Concierto
 Casetera Concierto

Slogans

References

External links
Official Website
Ibero Americana Radio Chile
PRISA

Radio stations in Chile
Mass media in Santiago
Radio stations established in 1972
1972 establishments in Chile
Radio stations established in 2000
2000 establishments in Chile
Adult album alternative radio stations